Apple Arcade is a video game subscription service offered by Apple Inc. It is available through a dedicated tab of the App Store on devices running iOS 13, tvOS 13, iPadOS 13, and macOS Catalina or later. The service launched on September 19, 2019.

It offers uninterrupted, unintrusive experiences by excluding practices commonly associated with popular, primarily free-to-play, mobile games such as in-app purchases and advertisements.

Features 
All games available on the service are free of advertisements, in-app purchases, data tracking processes, and always-on DRM, meaning games can be played offline and without interruptions. Subscribers can share access with up to five others through family sharing and the service can also be purchased through the Apple One bundle. Both standalone subscriptions and the Apple One bundle provide a free one-month trial and can be cancelled at any time. 
 
Games on the service feature integration with Game Center and iCloud, allowing games to implement social features such as achievements and leaderboards, and to carry data between devices when linked to the same iCloud account. In addition to Apple's own products, many games are compatible with third-party controllers such as the DualShock 4, DualSense and Xbox Wireless Controller, with support for Joy-Con and the Nintendo Switch Pro Controller added with the release of iOS 16. By extension, controllers modeled after classic Nintendo and Sega gamepads for use with Nintendo Switch Online are also supported with iOS 16.

History 
Apple Arcade was announced in March 2019 at an Apple Event showcasing their various upcoming services. It launched in September 2019 with 71 games, with Apple stating that the number would grow to over 100 by 2020. The apps support a minimum of 14 languages and can be accessed in over 150 countries. Launch titles included Sneaky Sasquatch, What the Golf, Sayonara Wild Hearts, Rayman Mini, Exit the Gungeon, and Lego Brawls.

Noted publishers and developers that have partnered with Apple to create Arcade games include Capcom, Sega, Bandai Namco Entertainment, Konami, and Annapurna Interactive. Developers cannot release their Apple Arcade games on other mobile platforms due to exclusivity agreements, but are allowed to offer their games on console or PC. Apple does not share game performance metrics with developers, only revealing whether the game has been accepted onto the Apple Arcade platform.

There are several categories within the platform that group together similar games based on their premise, genre, level of difficulty and more. Some categories include “adventure”, “puzzle”, and “education”. There is also a category called “daily play suggestions”, which offers a curated selection of games based on the consumer's download and gameplay history.

In June 2020, Bloomberg reported that Apple ended its contract with some future Arcade titles and shifted its strategy to seek games with stronger engagement to retain subscribers. It was further noted that Apple invited former Arcade partners to return and develop titles that would fit Apple's new strategy.

On April 2, 2021, Apple surprise-released a number of new games and announced that they would be bringing "Timeless Classics" and "App Store Greats" to the service. These are versions of preexisting popular games already available on the App Store which have had their in-app purchases and advertisements removed, denoted by a "+" at the end of the application name. Notable games added to the service include Fruit Ninja Classic+, Monument Valley+, and Threes!+. Unlike titles developed exclusively for Apple Arcade, these games are only available for iOS and iPadOS devices.

On May 31st, 2022, creator of the classic Shoot 'em up Space Harrier; Yu Suzuki announced an original arcade style rail shooting game Air Twister exclusively for Apple Arcade. In September 2022, Horizon Chase 2, the sequel of the award-winning retro racing game Horizon Chase, was released exclusively on the platform.

Revenue 
In 2018, premium games on the App Store generated US$476 million while free-to-play games produced US$21.3 billion in revenue. Also, the number of premium apps available on the App Store fell from 21.6% of total App Store games in 2014 to 9.3% in 2018. Some analysts argue that this is a contributing factor to the development and founding of Apple Arcade, with the economic perspective that consumers will be more incentivized to pay a subscription fee to access a range of premium apps rather than purchasing individual premium games. Others have argued that Apple Arcade is another source of revenue for Apple and enables them to compete with other video-game subscription services like Google Play Pass and Xbox Game Pass.

Apple spent $500 million to launch Apple Arcade. Apple pays app developers an upfront fee to create video-games for the platform and corresponds with some developers in the development process.

See also 
 Google Play Pass
Xbox Game Pass
GameClub

References

External links 
 

2019 in video gaming
Apple Inc. services
Subscription video game services
2020 in video gaming
Apple Inc.